Woodcar Independent Racing League (WIRL) is an independent racing league for pinewood car builders.

Pinewood car racing was popularized by the well known Boy Scout sanctioned Pinewood Derby. Unlike the Scout races, WIRL races are open to people of all ages and participants are not required to be a member of any particular organization. To compete in WIRL racing events, cars are sent to a central location where they are raced together on the same track. Cars can race for one year under one of four sets of rules:  Rookie, Pure Stock, Pro Stock and Modified.

See also
F1 In Schools
Valve cover racing

References

External links

 Woodcar Independent Beginner Racing League
 Pinewood Derby Drag Racing
 Pinewood Derby Racing League
 Pinewood Cup

Racing
Toy cars and trucks